The 2000 Segunda División Peruana, the second division of Peruvian football (soccer), was played by 13 teams. The tournament winner, Deportivo Aviación was promoted to the Playoff. The tournament was played on a home-and-away round-robin basis.
 Sporting Cristal B can´t be promoted as they are the "reserve team" of Sporting Cristal which plays in First Division.

Results

Standings

Promotion playoff

Notes

External links
 RSSSF

Peruvian Segunda División seasons
Peru2
2000 in Peruvian football